The Boston Common is the Barbershop quartet that won the 1980 SPEBSQSA international competition at Salt Lake City, Utah.

Formed in 1971, they took their name from Boston Common, a well known park.  Competing throughout the seventies, they were more popular with audiences than judges.  After they won silver in 1979, they agreed to compete one last time and took the gold in 1980 with their set of Lou Perry's arrangements of "Who Told You" and "That Old Quartet of Mine".  A traffic accident in 1982 left lead Rich Knapp unable to continue singing, but the quartet enlisted Tom Spirito of the Four Rascals to substitute.

Discography
 The Boston Common LP
 In The Heart of the City LP
 Many Happy Returns LP
 Smilin' Through LP
 Collective Works Double CD encompassing the above LPs

References

 Discography and biography from Primarily A Cappella
 Discography from Mike Barkley's Monster list
 AIC entry (archived)

Barbershop quartets
Barbershop Harmony Society